The 2020 Outback Bowl was a college football bowl game played on January 1, 2020, with kickoff at 1:00 p.m. EST on ESPN. It was the 34th edition of the Outback Bowl, and was one of the 2019–20 bowl games concluding the 2019 FBS football season. The game was named after its title sponsor, Outback Steakhouse.

Teams
The game matched the Minnesota Golden Gophers from the Big Ten Conference and the Auburn Tigers from the Southeastern Conference (SEC). This was the first meeting between the programs.

Minnesota Golden Gophers

Minnesota entered the game with a 10–2 record (7–2 in conference). They finished tied with Wisconsin atop the Big Ten's West Division—Wisconsin advanced to the Big Ten Championship Game due to their regular season win over Minnesota. The Golden Gophers were 1–2 against ranked FBS opponents, defeating Penn State while losing to Iowa and Wisconsin. This was Minnesota's first appearance in the Outback Bowl.

Auburn Tigers

Auburn entered the game with a 9–3 record (5–3 in conference). They finished in third place in the SEC's West Division. The Tigers were 3–3 against ranked FBS opponents, defeating Oregon, Texas A&M, and Alabama while losing to Florida, LSU, and Georgia. This was Auburn's fifth Outback Bowl; the Tigers were 2–2 in their previous appearances.

Game summary

Statistics

References

External links

Game statistics at statbroadcast.com

Outback Bowl
ReliaQuest Bowl
Outback Bowl
Outback Bowl
Auburn Tigers football bowl games
Minnesota Golden Gophers football bowl games